Kiruna Stamell is a British-Australian actress. Since January 2023, she has portrayed Kirsty Millar in the BBC soap opera Doctors.

Life and career
Stamell was born in Sydney, Australia with a rare form of dwarfism. She studied ballet, contemporary dance and tap. While studying dance, theatre and film at the University of New South Wales, Stamell developed her passion for acting, landing her first major role in the film Moulin Rouge!.  She has worked alongside leading artistic directors both in Europe and Australia, including Shaun Parker. Kiruna states that "'whilst (my) work is heavily influenced by my own experiences of dwarfism, disability, gender, sexuality... etc... no singular discourse defines my identity or my work." 

In 2005, Stamell was funded to study Shakespearean and Jacobean plays at LAMDA. Her British television career began in 2009 when she appeared as Phoebe Tunstall in the BBC drama series All the Small Things. She has also acted in EastEnders as Sandra Fielding, starred in Cast Offs for Channel 4, and as Amy in Life's Too Short for BBC 2. In 2012 Kiruna's audition for the Sky 1 series Got to Dance was televised, in which she was unanimously voted through.  She also appeared in Giuseppe Tornatore's 2013 film, The Best Offer appearing alongside Geoffrey Rush.  Later in 2014, Stamell appeared in Great Britain at The National Theatre, her West End debut. In 2019 she continued on the stage, as one of the original cast members of the Olivier Award-winning Cyrano de Bergerac production, starring James McAvoy, with The Jamie Lloyd Company. She also appeared on television in the critically aclaimed drama series The New Pope starring Jude Law. Throughout lockdown 2020, Kiruna presented on ABC's Playschool, winning her the Kidscreen Award for Best On-Air Host. She has also starred in the National Theatre of Scotland’s production of Them. In 2022, Kiruna was seen in Starz television series The Serpent Queen, as Mathilde, the Queen's maid and close confidant.

Stamell has lived in England for over 20 years, and in Birmingham since 2011. She is a frequent guest presenter on the BBC's Ouch! podcast. Kiruna has been involved in the disability arts movement for many years, and was an original co-founder of Atypical Theatre Company in Australia. She is co-director, alongside her husband Gareth Berliner, of the production company A Little Commitment Ltd. In January 2023, Stammell began appearing as receptionist Kirsty Millar in the BBC soap opera Doctors.

Work

Film and television
 Moulin Rouge! – La Petite Princess (directed by Baz Luhrmann)
 Cast Offs – Carrie (directed by Miranda Bowen)
 EastEnders – Sandra Fielding (directed by Richard Platt)
 All The Small Things – Phoebe (directed by Cilla Ware)
 Life's Too Short – Amy (Ricky Gervais)
 The Best Offer – the "real" Claire (directed by Giuseppe Tornatore)
 Life Support – PA (directed by David McDonald)
 Father Brown – Enid Flay – episode 3.3 "The Invisible Man"
 Play School – Kiruna (from September 2018)
 The New Pope – Abbess of the Monastery of Saint Therese (created and directed by Paolo Sorrentino)
 The Serpent Queen – Mathilde
 Doctors – Kirsty Millar

Stage
 Great Britain... Wendy Klinkard (Lyttelton Theatre and West End transfer, directed by Nicholas Hytner)
 A Midsummer Night's Dream... Starveling (directed by David Thacker)
 Whiter Than Snow... Frieda (directed by Jenny Sealey)
 For All the Wrong Reasons... Femme Fatal (directed by Lies Pauwels)
 King Lear... Cordelia (directed by Richard Davey)
 Here's to the Small Minded...(directed by Matt Noffs)
 The Maids... Claire (directed by Paul Barry)
 Grace... Deviser/Performer (directed by Richard Gregory)
 Preserving the Apple... Rai (directed by Nikki Heywood)
 Macbeth... King Duncan (directed by Benjamin Winspear)
 Why Dwarves Hate Christmas ... One Woman Show (directed by Gareth Berliner)
 The Lost Happy Endings ...Sparrow/Witch (directed by Wendy Rouse and Amanda Wilde)
 Peeling ...Beaty (directed by Kirstie Davis)
 The Ugly Spirit (directed by Deborah Wintle)
 The Ministry of Lesbian Affairs (directed by Hannah Hauer-King)

References

External links
 
 

Australian film actresses
Australian soap opera actresses
Alumni of the London Academy of Music and Dramatic Art
1981 births
United Kingdom disability case law
Living people
Actors with dwarfism
21st-century Australian actresses
Television presenters with disabilities